The 1902 Cleveland Bronchos season was a season in American baseball. The team, known during this season as the "Bronchos" (or "Broncos"), finished in fifth place in the American League with a record of 69–67, 14 games behind the Philadelphia Athletics.

Regular season 

In 1902, the National League's Philadelphia Phillies obtained an injunction, effective only in Pennsylvania, barring Nap Lajoie from playing baseball for any team other than the Phillies. The American League responded by transferring Lajoie's contract to the Cleveland Guardians, then known unofficially as the Bronchos and subsequently renamed the "Naps" in Lajoie's honor for several seasons.

Season standings

Record vs. opponents

Notable transactions 
 May 31, 1902: Nap Lajoie was signed as a free agent by the Cleveland club.

Roster

Player stats

Batting

Starters by position 
Note: Pos = Position; G = Games played; AB = At bats; H = Hits; Avg. = Batting average; HR = Home runs; RBI = Runs batted in

Other batters 
Note: G = Games played; AB = At bats; H = Hits; Avg. = Batting average; HR = Home runs; RBI = Runs batted in

Pitching

Starting pitchers 
Note: G = Games pitched; IP = Innings pitched; W = Wins; L = Losses; ERA = Earned run average; SO = Strikeouts

Other pitchers 
Note: G = Games pitched; IP = Innings pitched; W = Wins; L = Losses; ERA = Earned run average; SO = Strikeouts

Relief pitchers 
Note: G = Games pitched; W = Wins; L = Losses; SV = Saves; ERA = Earned run average; SO = Strikeouts

Notes

References 
1902 Cleveland Bronchos season at Baseball Reference

Cleveland Guardians seasons
Cleveland Bronchos season
1902 in sports in Ohio